North Caribou Lake First Nation or Weagamow First Nation, sometimes also known as Round Lake First Nation, is an Oji-Cree First Nations band government who inhabit the Kenora District in northern Ontario, Canada. As of January 2008, the First Nations had a registered population of 928 people, of which their on-Reserve population was 677.

Name

Though the First Nation's official name registered with the Indian and Northern Affairs Canada is "North Caribou Lake First Nation," the Nation is located on Weagamow Lake, thus also known as "Weagamow First Nation" or by the literal translation of the Oji-Cree word Wiyaagamaa—"Round Lake."
And Nikolas Chikane the chief

Governance

The First Nation elect their officials through a Custom Electoral System, consisting of a Chief and seven councillors. The current Chief is Cornelius Benson. Head Band Councillor is Ernest Quequish. Elder Band Councillor is Silas Jeremiah. Youth Advocate Band Councillor is Carlena Petawanick. The other Band Councillors are Paul Johnup, Raymond Adams, Grace Matawapit, & Leo Sakchekapo, Nikolas Chikane [2020]

As a signatory to the 1929 Adhesion to Treaty No. 9, North Caribou Lake First Nation is a member of the Windigo First Nations Council, a Regional Chiefs Council, and Nishnawbe Aski Nation, a Tribal Political Organization that represents majority of First Nation governments in Northern Ontario. Signatories for the Nation, July 18, 1930, were Apin Kakapeness, Jonas Wasakimik, Samuel Sawanis, John Quequeish, Patrick Kakekayash, and Sena Sakchekapo, all of whom signed in Syllabic.

Reserve

The First Nation have reserved for themselves the 9172.3 ha Weagamow Lake Indian Reserve 87.  The community of Weagamow Lake, Ontario, is located on this Indian reserve.

External links 
AANDC profile
profile at Windigo First Nations

References

First Nations governments in Ontario
Communities in Kenora District
Oji-Cree reserves in Ontario
Road-inaccessible communities of Ontario